Louisiana State University Shreveport (LSU Shreveport or LSUS) is a public university in Shreveport, Louisiana. It is part of the Louisiana State University System.  Initially, a two-year college, LSUS has expanded into a university with 21 undergraduate degree programs, a dozen master's degree programs, and more recently a Doctorate of Education (Ed.D.) in Leadership Studies. LSUS offers more than 70 extra-curricular organizations and operates Red River Radio, a public radio network based in Shreveport.

History
In September 1967, Louisiana State University Shreveport opened its doors as a two-year commuter college with an enrollment of 807 students under the direction of Dean Donald Shipp. The campaign to establish a branch of Louisiana State University (LSU) in Shreveport began in 1936 when the Caddo Parish Police Jury passed a resolution for the school with the support of Frank Fulco and several civic organizations including the Queensborough Civic Club. However, when Louisiana State Senator Roscoe Cranor presented the formal request to Governor Richard Leche in 1937, he rejected the proposal.

Another nineteen years would past before State Representative Frank Fulco introduce a bill to the Louisiana House in 1956 to, yet again, establish a branch of LSU in Shreveport. It failed in committee, forcing Representative Fulco to introduce a resolution calling for a feasibility study by the State Department of Education to determine the need for a state college in Shreveport. This time, the resolution passes; the study took two years to complete. It revealed that not only was a public college needed in Shreveport but that the citizens of the area desired it, invigorating debate among various Louisiana state legislators, governors, universities, civic clubs, and, of course, private citizens over its necessity and fiscality. Fortunately, the debate concluded in 1964 with the introduction of House Bill 87.

Co-authored by Representative Algie Brown [Caddo]; Frank Fulco [Caddo]; J. Bennett Johnston [Caddo]; Ford Stinson [Bossier]; and Joe Cooper [DeSoto], House Bill 87 set to create a two-year branch of LSU in Shreveport. It passed in both the House and Senate and signed into law by Governor John J. McKeithen on June 27, 1967, under Act No 41. At the same time another junior college, Southern University at Shreveport (SUSLA), also opened. By 1965, the LSU Board of Supervisors formally had established LSUS as an integral division of Louisiana State University and appoints Donald Shipp as the first Dean of LSUS.

Shipp quickly establishes a base of operations at the old Line Avenue School with A.J. Howell as the business manager and Mrs. Fabia Thomas as the Registrar and hires the original core faculty. The Line Avenue School remained the center location for the students, faculty, and staff until the completed construction of the three-story Science Building and a two-story Library on the new campus grounds located off Hwy 1 in Southeast Shreveport in 1967.

Soon after classes began that September in 1967, a push for a four-year status for LSUS ensues by the Student Government Association and Circle K Club of LSUS along with other prominent members of Shreveport. Louisiana State Senator Don Williamson of Caddo Parish heard their calls and became the lead author of Senate Bill No. 16 for a four-year degree granting status for LSUS supported by State Senators Jackson B. Davis [Caddo] and C. Kay Carter [Caddo] and an onslaught of State Representatives. William "Bill" Bronson, publisher of the Shreveport Times and Vice Chairman of the Coordinating Council for Higher Education, uses his powers of persuasion and both The Times and The Monroe Morning World to endorse the four-year bill for LSUS.

However, surrounding colleges, fearing the loss of student enrollment to a state four-year degree-granting university, staunchly opposed LSUS becoming a four-year school. In fact, the opposition sought to kill the bill by securing the opinion of the Attorney General, stating approval of the proposal would require a two-thirds vote rather than a simple majority. Additionally, an amendment attached to the bill prohibited the construction of dormitories on the Shreveport campus. However, the supporters of the bill agreed to the change, and Governor Edwin Edwards signed the bill into law June 22, 1972, under Act No. 66. Shortly afterward, the Louisiana Council for Higher Education authorized four major academic divisions and 39 degree programs for LSUS. By the fall of 1973, Dean Shipp is promoted to Chancellor, and LSUS institutes its third academic year and its senior year in the fall of 1974.

On May 15, 1975, LSUS held its first commencement at the Municipal Auditorium in Shreveport conferring degrees on 223 students almost 40 years after the initial effort of Frank Fulco to establish a branch of LSU in Shreveport.

On May 5, 1978, the Academic Affairs Committee of the Board of Regents for the State of Louisiana unanimously adopted the motion for LSUS to offer graduate studies for the Master of Education in Secondary Education catapulting LSUS and the Shreveport area into the graduate consortium. Just a year later, the same committee approved the graduate studies for the Master of Business Administration at LSUS, and by 2016, LSUS would have an additional ten graduate programs.

The institution received approval from the Board of Regents for the State of Louisiana on May 22, 2013, to begin offering the Doctor of Education (Ed.D.). The following year, the Southern Association of Colleges and Schools Commission on Colleges (SACSCOC) approved the institution to be accredited as a Level V institution.

Academics
LSUS offers 21 undergraduate programs, 12 Master's degrees, and one Doctoral degree. All of LSUS' business degrees are accredited by AACSB-International. LSUS offers several night courses, catering to its non-traditional student population, and it offers online courses, including four 100% online master's degrees (Master of Nonprofit Organizations, Master of Business Administration, Master of Education in Curriculum and Instruction, and Master of Health Administration).

The university has a student-teacher ratio of 24:1 and 81% of the professors have terminal degrees, the highest degree awarded in a given field. Many of LSUS' professors have been published and nationally recognized and sit on nationally recognized boards related to their disciplines.

Student life 
The University Center (UC) at LSUS serves as the campus hub for student, faculty, and staff activities and is a centerpiece of the LSUS campus. The UC staff maintains up-to-date information on each registered student organization such as its officers or authorized representatives, its purpose, and its adviser. Each year, the UC publishes a list of current clubs with the names of the groups according to the nine categories of student organizations.

Organizations 
LSUS has over 70 student organizations that include Academic/Professional, Governing, Greek, Honorary, Religious, Service, Special Interest, and Sports.

Media 
The Almagest, Greek for "great book," is the university's student newspaper in both print and broadcasting and has kept the community at LSUS informed since 1967. It is the brainchild of Mrs. Evelyn Herring, an assistant professor of English at LSUS, along with four other students. The paper is published six to twelve times each fall and spring semester. In 2015, the paper went 100% online.

Spectra, called Narcissus initially, is a student literary magazine that has been in production since 1969 that consists of student and faculty poetry and prose as well as visual artwork. It is published once a year and submissions for the magazine are taken throughout the fall and spring semesters.

The Toilet Paper is a promotional paper that is published and emailed weekly that advertises student and faculty events for the upcoming week or month.

Greek 
Social fraternal or sorority organizations make up the Greek Life at LSUS with its membership driven by invitation only. However, recruitment is open to all students both in the fall and spring semesters. Additionally, both fraternal and sorority encourage academic achievement, leadership, and community.  The Greek Council oversees and plans the annual Greek Week, Meet the Greeks, and a Greek step show, to promote a sense of community among the Greek members and the students of LSUS.  
 Fraternities at LSUS: Alpha Phi Alpha, Kappa Alpha Psi, Kappa Sigma, and Tau Kappa Epsilon
 Sororities at LSUS: Alpha Kappa Alpha, Phi Mu, Sigma Phi Iota, and Zeta Phi Beta.

Libraries

The Noel Memorial Library 
The Noel Memorial Library collects materials sufficient to support the university's curricula, then organizes the elements, and makes them readily available to the patrons of the library. Supplies readily available consist of 250,000 books, access to 100,000 electronic books, and 60,000 electronic journals. Additionally, the library houses The Northwest Louisiana Archives and Special Collections and the James Smith Noel Collection of rare books, which is under permanent loan to LSUS. Also, the library is a select depository for United States Government Documents and Louisiana State documents.

Northwest Louisiana Archives 
The Northwest Louisiana Archives accumulates individual collections relating to the Shreveport area, northwest Louisiana, and the lower Red River region such as vital historical records and manuscripts from the area known as the Ark-La-Tex. Within the Archives, you will find over 1.5 million photographs and negatives documenting the history and culture of the Ark-La-Tex, 800 maps, over 200 oral histories, and 23,000 linear feet of records and manuscripts that are available for researchers to discover the rich and colorful heritage of the region.

The Noel Collection 
The Noel Collection houses the most extensive private collection of antiquarian books in the United States with an approximate 250,000 volumes that range from religion, philosophy, natural history, curiosities, travel literature, cartography, and much more, and is the life's work of Mr. James Smith Noel. Within the collection, pre-1850 European and American literature and history are most prevalent.

Paul Jones Library 
The Paul Jones Library opened on Nov. 1, 2015, in Room 421 of Bronson Hall. It is a closed-stack collection containing over 2500 books donated by Mr. Jones and faculty members of LSUS. It covers all aspects of history but has a particular focus on the US Civil War and World War II; it also has a great many books on antiquity.

Museums

The Museum of Life Sciences 

The Museum of Life Sciences has the following cataloged collections:
 9,148 specimens of Amphibians and Reptiles
 2,032 specimens of Mammals 
 2,118 specimens of Birds
 1,430 specimens of Fish
 35,700 specimens of Mollusk
 2,000 specimens of Insects
 2,650 specimens of Spiders
 107 specimens of Crawfish
 10,678 specimens of Vascular Plants

Pioneer Heritage Center

In 1977, the Junior League of Shreveport and LSUS established the Pioneer Heritage Center on the grounds of the LSUS campus as an educational program that provides interpretive tours through the seven plantation structures at the center.

Buildings at the Center include:
 The Caspiana House (the big house from the Caspiana Plantation)
 The Thrasher House (a log dogtrot)
 A detached Kitchen 
 A log single pen blacksmith shop
 A doctor's office
 A commissary
 A riverfront mission

Athletics

The LSU–Shreveport (LSUS) athletic teams are called the Pilots. The university is a member of the National Association of Intercollegiate Athletics (NAIA), primarily competing in the Red River Athletic Conference (RRAC) since the 2010–11 academic year. The Pilots previously competed in the Gulf Coast Athletic Conference (GCAC) from 2000–01 to 2009–10.

LSUS competes in six intercollegiate varsity sports: Men's sports include baseball, basketball and soccer; while women's sports include basketball, soccer and tennis. Club sports include bass fighting, eSports and weightlifting.

Accomplishments
The LSUS athletic program has produced many championship teams collecting nine regular season conference titles, 16 conference tournament championships, and competed in 31 NAIA National Tournaments.

Facilities
The Health and Physical Education Building includes The Dock, a 1,000-seat gymnasium and home to the LSUS men's and women's basketball teams. The Health and Physical Education Building also includes the USA Weightlifting High Performance and Development Center which is home to the LSUS weightlifting team, the LSUS Natatorium houses a six-lane lap pool and the facility also has an indoor track. Located adjacent to the building and part of the complex are eight tennis courts.

Pilot Field is home to the LSUS baseball team and The Swamp is the home of the men's and women's soccer teams.

Notable people that graduated from this University

Alumni
Royal Alexander, attorney in Shreveport
Ransom Ashley, artist and photographer
Hazel Beard, former mayor of Shreveport
Sherri Smith Buffington, former state senator from Caddo Parish and DeSoto Parish parish
Jeff Cox, Division C judge of the 26th Judicial District Court since 2005
Brandon Friedman, former Deputy Assistant Secretary, United States Department of Housing and Urban Development; author of The War I Always Wanted
Mary Johnson Harris, District 4 member of the Louisiana Board of Elementary and Secondary Education
Barbara Norton (Legal course), state representative for District 3 in Caddo Parish since 2008 
Ollie Tyler, Mayor of Shreveport, did graduate study at LSU
Kendrick Farris, Olympic weightlifter
Sylvia Hoffman, Olympic Bobsledder
Dorothy Ching-Davis, Special effects makeup artist, and stunt women (Star Trek VI: The Undiscovered Country (1991), Rescue Me (1992) and Love, Cheat & Steal (1993).

Faculty
 Alexander Mikaberidze, a Georgian lawyer, author and historian who specializes in Napoleonic studies, Russian history and Georgian history. He is a professor of history and social sciences.
 Jeffrey D. Sadow, an LSUS political science professor and widely known political blogger, journalist, and satirist.

References

External links
 
 Official athletics website

 
Shreveport
Universities and colleges accredited by the Southern Association of Colleges and Schools
Tourist attractions in Shreveport, Louisiana
Buildings and structures in Shreveport, Louisiana
Public universities and colleges in Louisiana